Julie Inglis (born 5 August 1963) is an association football player who represented New Zealand at international level.

Inglis made her Football Ferns debut as a substitute in a 3–0 win over Switzerland on 8 December 1984, and finished her international career with 15 caps to her credit.

References

1963 births
Living people
New Zealand women's association footballers
New Zealand women's international footballers

Women's association footballers not categorized by position